Sam Draper (born 28 September 1998) is an Australian rules footballer who plays for the Essendon Football Club in the Australian Football League (AFL). He was recruited with the 1st draft pick in the 2017 AFL rookie draft.

Early Football
Draper was born in South Australia, but lived in Brede in East Sussex for six years, where he enjoyed playing soccer.

Draper played for South Adelaide in the SANFL for the 2016 season.

AFL career

2020 season: debut
Draper debuted in the 9th round of the 2020 AFL season  in 's 63 point loss against the Brisbane Lions.  On debut, he picked up 9 disposals, 2 marks and 2 tackles, and kicked a behind.

He quickly became a fan favourite through the remainder of the 2020 season due mostly to his extremely physical style of play and mullet hair style. He went on to play 8 games, and win the club’s Lindsay Griffith’s Rising Star award at the conclusion of the season.

2021 season
Draper suffered a Syndesmosis injury in round 2, after a good start to the beginning of the season.  He was out of the team for 12 weeks, before returning to the lineup in round 14.

2022 season
Sam kicked goal of the year against the Gold Coast Suns in Round 18.  Eddie Betts called it goal of the year during the course of live commentary.

Statistics
Statistics are correct to the end of the 2022 season 

|-
! scope="row" style="text-align:center" | 2020
|  || 38 || 8 || 1 || 3 || 46 || 20 || 66 || 15 || 15 || 148 || 0.1 || 0.4 || 5.8 || 2.5 || 8.3 || 1.9 || 1.9 || 18.5
|-
|- style="background-color: #EAEAEA"
! scope="row" style="text-align:center" | 2021
|  || 2 || 13 || 2 || 5 || 85 || 46 || 131 || 31 || 23 || 316 || 0.1 || 0.3 || 6.5 || 3.5 || 10.0 || 2.3 || 1.7 || 24.3
|- 
|- style="background-color: #EAEAEA"
! scope="row" style="text-align:center" | 2022
|  || 2 || 22 || 12 || 7 || 140 || 74 || 214 || 35 || 33 || 523 || 0.6 || 0.3 || 6.4 || 3.4 || 9.7 || 1.6 || 1.5 || 23.8
|- class="sortbottom"
! colspan=3| Career
! 43
! 15
! 15
! 271
! 140
! 411
! 81
! 71
! 987
! 0.4
! 0.4
! 6.3
! 3.3
! 9.6
! 1.9
! 1.7
! 23.0
|}

References

External links

1998 births
Living people
Essendon Football Club players
Australian rules footballers from South Australia
South Adelaide Football Club players
People from Brede, East Sussex